Andrew Lane (born 17 April 1963), as Andy Lane, is a British author and journalist best known for the Young Sherlock Holmes series of Young Adult novels.

He has written novels in the Virgin New Adventures range and audio dramas for Big Finish based on the BBC science fiction television series Doctor Who.

His Young Adult books are generally published under the name Andrew Lane, while media spin offs are Andy Lane.

Career
During 2009, Macmillan Books announced that Lane would be writing a series of books focusing on the early life of Sherlock Holmes. The series was developed in conjunction with the estate of Sir Arthur Conan Doyle. Lane had already shown an extensive knowledge of the Holmes character and continuity in his Virgin Books novel All-Consuming Fire in which he created The Library of St. John the Beheaded as a meeting place for the worlds of Sherlock Holmes and Doctor Who.

The first book in the 'Young Sherlock Holmes' series – Death Cloud – was published in the United Kingdom in June 2010 (February 2011 in the United States), with the second – Red Leech – published in the United Kingdom in November of that year (with a United States publication date under the title Rebel Fire of February 2012). The third book – Black Ice – was published in June 2011 in the UK while the fourth book – Fire Storm – was published originally in hardback in October 2011 with a paperback publication in March 2012. The fifth book, Snake Bite was published in hardback in October 2012 and the sixth book, Knife Edge was published in September 2013. Death Cloud was short-listed for both the 2010 North East Book Award. (coming second by three votes) and the 2011 Southampton's Favourite Book Award. Black Ice won the 2012 Centurion Book Award.

Early in 2012, Macmillan Children's Books announced that they would be publishing a new series by Lane, beginning in 2013. The Lost World books will follow disabled 15-year-old Calum Challenger, who is coordinating a search from his London bedroom to find creatures considered so rare that many do not believe they exist. Calum's intention is to use the creatures' DNA to help protect the species, but also to search for a cure for his own paralysis. His team comprises a computer hacker, a free runner, an ex-marine and a pathological liar.

Personal life

Lane studied physics at the University of Warwick, where he was a contemporary and friend of writers Justin Richards and Craig Hinton.

He worked for the Ministry of Defence at Farnborough during which time he lived in Ash in Surrey for 11 years; since 2012 he has lived with his wife and son in Poole in Dorset, England.  He is represented by Robert Kirby at United Agents.

Bibliography

Novels

Agent Without Licence

Agent Without Licence (July 2018) 
Last Safe Moment (October 2018) 
Last Boy Standing (January 2019) 
Last Day on Earth (July 2019)

The Six Directions Sequence

Netherspace (May 2017) (with Nigel Foster) 
Originators (November 2018) (with Nigel Foster) 
Revelations (May 2021) written by Nigel Foster alone

Crusoe

Dawn of Spies (Mar 2016) 
Day of Ice (Mar 2017) 
Night of Terror (Mar 2018)

Lost Worlds

Lost Worlds (2013) 
Shadow Creatures (2014)

Young Sherlock Holmes

Death Cloud (2010) 
Red Leech (2010) 
Black Ice (2011) 
Fire Storm (2011) 
Snake Bite (2012) 
Knife Edge (2013) 
Stone Cold (2014) 
Night Break (2015)

Virgin Books Doctor Who New Adventures

Lucifer Rising (1993) (with Jim Mortimore) 
All-Consuming Fire (1994) 
Original Sin (1995)

Virgin Books Doctor Who Missing Adventures

The Empire of Glass (1995)

BBC Books Eighth Doctor Who Adventures

The Banquo Legacy (2000) (with Justin Richards)

Torchwood

Slow Decay (2007)

Other television-related novels and novelisations

Bugs : A Sporting Chance (1996)
Randall and Hopkirk: Ghost in the Machine (2000)

Film- and television-related non-fiction

The Babylon File (1997) 
The Bond Files: The Unofficial Guide to Ian Fleming's James Bond (1998) (with Paul Simpson)
The Babylon File: Volume 2 (1999)
Randall and Hopkirk (Deceased) – The Files (2001)
The World of Austin Powers (2002)
Creating Creature Comforts (2003)
The World of Wallace and Gromit (2004)
The World of The Magic Roundabout (2005) (with Paul Simpson)
The Art of Wallace & Gromit: The Curse of the Were-Rabbit (2005) (with Paul Simpson)

Short stories

'Living in the Past'  (in Doctor Who Magazine, Issue 162, July 1990)
'Crawling From the Wreckage'  (in The Ultimate Witch, Dell 1993)
'The More Things Change'  (in Doctor Who Yearbook, 1994)
'Lovers, and Other Strangers'  (in Interzone, issue 87, September 1994)
'Fallen Angel'	(in Decalog, Virgin 1994)
'It's Only a Game'  (in Doctor Who Yearbook, 1995)
'Faceless in Ghazar'  (in Blake's Seven Poster Magazine, Issue 2, Jan 1995)
'The Old, Old Story'  (in The Ultimate Dragon, 1995)
'Saving Face'  (in Full Spectrum 5, 1995)
'Where the Heart Is'  (in Decalog 2, 1995)
'Four Angry Mutants' (with Rebecca Levene) (in The Ultimate X-Men, 1996)
'Dependence Day'  (with Justin Richards) (in Decalog 4, 1997)
'No Experience Necessary'  (in Odyssey issue 2, 1997)
'As Near to Flame as Lust to Smoke'  (in Shakespearean Detectives, 1998)
'The Gaze of the Falcon'  (in The Mammoth Book of Royal Whodunnits, 1998)
'Blood on the Tracks'  (in Bernice Summerfield – Missing Adventures, 2007)
'Only Connect'  (in Short Trips: Transmissions, 2008)
'The Beauty of Our Weapons'  (in Torchwood Yearbook, 2008)
'Who by Fire?'  (in Torchwood Magazine, Issue 14; 2009)
'Closing Time'  (in Torchwood Magazine, Issues 16 & 17; 2009)
'The Audience of the Dead'  (in The Strand Magazine, Issue 34, June–Sept 2011)
'Bedlam'  (a Young Sherlock Holmes short story published exclusively for the Kindle ebook reader, Dec 2011)
'The Preservation of Death'  (in The Strand Magazine, Issue unknown, 2013)
'The Curious Case of the Compromised Card Files'  (in The Further Encounters of Sherlock Holmes, March 2014, expanded from a piece written for a Barclay's Bank internal document in 2011)
'Blood Relations'  (in Sharkpunk!, Snowbooks, planned for May 2015)
'Shine A Light'  (in The X-Files, Volume 2, IDW, planned for late 2015)
'Flickering Flame' (in Cwej: Down the Middle, October 2020)

Television

Space Island One

'Awakenings' (story) (1998)
'Mayfly' (script) (1998)
'Money Makes the World Go Around' (story) (1998)

Audio

Doctor Who

The Companion Chronicles: ‘Here There Be Monsters' (June 2008)
The Companion Chronicles: ‘The Mahogany Murderers' (June 2009)
A Thousand Tiny Wings (April 2010)
Paradise 5 (with P.J. Hammond) (April 2010)
Jago & Litefoot 1.4: 'The Similarity Engine' (June 2010)
Jago & Litefoot 2.4: 'The Ruthven Inheritance' (January 2011)
Jago & Litefoot 3.4: 'Chronoclasm' (June 2011)
Jago & Litefoot 8.2: 'The Backwards Men' (October 2014)
The Havoc of Empires (early 2015)

Blake's Seven

Corners of the Mind (planned for some time in 2015)

Journalism
Lane has written articles, reviews and interviews for various magazines, including: DreamWatch, Radio Times, SFX, Starburst, Star Trek Magazine, Star Wars Magazine, Star Wars Fact Files and TV Guide (United States).

References

External links

 https://us.macmillan.com/author/andrewlane/

Date of birth missing (living people)
Place of birth missing (living people)
1963 births
20th-century British novelists
21st-century British novelists
Alumni of the University of Warwick
British science fiction writers
British male journalists
British male novelists
Living people
Writers of Doctor Who novels
Writers from Dorset
People with bipolar disorder